Reza Qeshlaq (also Romanized as Reẕā Qeshlāq; also known as Reẕā Qeshlāqī) is a village in Chaharduli Rural District, Keshavarz District, Shahin Dezh County, West Azerbaijan Province, Iran. At the 2006 census, its population was 162, in 43 families.

References 

Populated places in Shahin Dezh County